William Anderson (born January 13, 1947) is a former American football player and coach.  He served as the head football coach at North Park University from 1978 to 1985 and at Illinois College from 1986 to 1994, compiling a career college football record of 46–107.  Anderson played football for four seasons at North Park before graduating in 1969.  In addition to coaching football at North Park, he also chaired the physical education department.

Head coaching record

References

1947 births
Living people
Illinois College Blueboys football coaches
North Park Vikings football coaches
North Park Vikings football players